Louis DeLuca (born August 17, 1933) is a retired businessman and a Republican Party politician in the United States. He served as the state senator for the 32nd District of Connecticut until November 30, 2007.

Political career
DeLuca was born in Everett, Massachusetts.  He was elected to the senate in 1990, representing Bethlehem, Bridgewater, Middlebury, Oxford, Roxbury, Seymour, Southbury, Thomaston, Watertown and Woodbury.  He served as Senate Minority Leader in the Connecticut State Senate from 2002 to 2007.

He assisted in the successful effort to ban MTBE from Connecticut's gasoline supplies. For his efforts, he received environmental awards from the Housatonic Valley Association and the Pomperaug Watershed Coalition.

He has announced his opposition to the proposal of Governor Jodi Rell to increase the state income tax to pay for added education funding.

Scandal

On June 1, 2007 DeLuca was arrested upon allegations that he asked James Galante, a businessman linked to a garbage corruption scandal, to intervene in a domestic abuse problem of a family member. James Galante is reported to have paid Matthew Ianniello of the Genovese crime family $120,000 a year in protection money for his Connecticut and Westchester Country trash-hauling routes. 

On June 4, 2007 Senator DeLuca pleaded guilty to a misdemeanor threatening charge, received a suspended sentence, and was ordered to pay a fine. On June 12, 2007, DeLuca announced he would step down as leader of the Senate Republicans and was replaced by 28th District Senator John McKinney, son of late Congressman Stewart McKinney.

A special senate committee was convened to determine if DeLuca should be officially sanctioned. One Republican state senator, David Cappiello, called on DeLuca to resign his seat.

On August 4, 2007, the husband of DeLuca's granddaughter, Mark Colella, was interviewed by the Hartford Courant. While he denied abusing DeLuca's granddaughter, he admitted to a long record of criminal charges and said of DeLuca, "I'd like to smack his teeth down his throat,"

On October 15, 2007, DeLuca testified in front of the committee investigating him, acknowledging under oath that he asked Galante to threaten his grandson-in-law and that he also knowingly had lied to FBI officers when they questioned him during their investigation.  He also told the committee that he reported to Waterbury Chief of Police Neil O'Leary of his granddaughter's alleged abuse but the chief refused to investigate the claim.  O'Leary, in response, said that he is willing to testify under oath in front of the committee to give his side of the story.

On November 13, 2007, DeLuca announced his resignation from the Senate, effective November 30, 2007.

Watertown councilman Rob Kane, a Republican, was elected in a January 15, 2008 special election to serve out the balance of DeLuca's term.

See also
Connecticut Senate

References

 
Senate Republicans - Senator Louis DeLuca. ct.gov. Retrieved on 2007-11-13.

External links
https://web.archive.org/web/20060424080736/http://www.senaterepublicans.ct.gov/senainfo/DeLuca.htm

Living people
1933 births
Republican Party Connecticut state senators
Politicians from Everett, Massachusetts
People from Woodbury, Connecticut
20th-century American politicians
21st-century American politicians
Connecticut politicians convicted of crimes